Amboasary Nord is a rural village in the Analamanga Region, Madagascar, in the district of Anjozorobe.

It has a population of 8,255 inhabitants in 2019.

External links
 mindat.org

Populated places in Analamanga